Fushë-Prezë is a village in the former municipality of Prezë in Tirana County, Albania. At the 2015 local government reform it became part of the municipality Vorë.

References

Populated places in Vorë
Villages in Tirana County